Cossmannica catinati is a species of sea snail, a marine gastropod mollusk in the family Pyramidellidae, the pyrams and their allies.

Distribution
This species, along with many other species within this genus of gastropods, occurs throughout the Gulf of Thailand and off the coasts of Vietnam.

References

External links
 To World Register of Marine Species

Pyramidellidae
Gastropods described in 1959